South Lake is a lake located west of Sled Harbor, New York. Fish species present in the lake are brook trout, black bullhead, and white sucker. There is trail access on the southeast shore. No motors are allowed on this lake. South Lake is one of three of the West Canada Lakes that are the source of West Canada Creek.

References

Lakes of New York (state)
Lakes of Hamilton County, New York